Phillip Thomas (born March 1, 1989) is a former American football safety. He played college football at Fresno State, and was drafted by the Washington Redskins in the fourth round of the 2013 NFL Draft.

Early years
Thomas was born in Bakersfield, California.  He attended Bakersfield High School, and played high school football for the Bakersfield Drillers.

College career
Thomas attended California State University, Fresno, where he played for the Fresno State Bulldogs football team from 2008 to 2012.  As a senior in 2012, he was named an All-American by the American Football Coaches Association (AFCA) and CBS Sports. He was also a finalist for the Jim Thorpe Award. He was named to the ESPN All-America team and winner of the 2012 CFPA Defensive Back Trophy. He became the first unanimous All-American in Fresno State history when he was named to the Associated Press All-America team.

Professional career

2013 NFL Combine

Washington Redskins
Thomas was selected by the Washington Redskins in the fourth round, with the 119th overall pick, of the 2013 NFL Draft. He officially signed a four-year contract with the team on May 17, 2013. In the first preseason game against the Tennessee Titans, he suffered a left foot injury, which was originally diagnosed as a sprain. On August 13, it was announced that Thomas would miss the entire 2013 season and be placed on injured reserve due to a torn Lisfranc ligament.

Battling hamstring and foot injuries in the preseason, the Redskins waived him on August 30, 2014 for final roster cuts before the start of the 2014 season. After clearing waivers, he was signed to the team's practice squad the following day. He was promoted to the active roster on November 1, 2014. He was waived on August 5, 2015.

Miami Dolphins
Thomas signed with the Miami Dolphins on August 10, 2015. On August 30, 2015, he was waived.

Buffalo Bills
On December 30, 2015, the Buffalo Bills signed Thomas to their practice squad. On January 4, 2016, he signed a futures contract with the Bills. On June 17, 2016, he was waived. On June 20, 2016, the Bills placed Thomas on injured reserve after clearing waivers.

On March 6, 2017, Thomas was released by the Bills.

Personal life
His older brother was featured in a Frontline documentary "Stickup Kid"

References

External links
Washington Redskins bio 
Fresno State Bulldogs bio 

1989 births
Living people
All-American college football players
American football safeties
Fresno State Bulldogs football players
Washington Redskins players
Miami Dolphins players
Buffalo Bills players
Players of American football from Bakersfield, California